Frederick Johnston (10 September 1915 – 6 September 1977) was an Australian cricketer. He played 36 first-class matches for New South Wales between 1946/47 and 1950/51.

See also
 List of New South Wales representative cricketers

References

External links
 

1915 births
1977 deaths
Australian cricketers
New South Wales cricketers
Cricketers from Sydney